Chief Theater may refer to:

Chief Theater (Coldwater, Kansas), listed on the National Register of Historic Places in Comanche County, Kansas
Chief Theater (Gallup, New Mexico), listed on the National Register of Historic Places in McKinley County, New Mexico